Ashleigh Barty defeated the defending champion Elina Svitolina in the final, 6–4, 6–3 to win the singles tennis title at the 2019 WTA Finals. With the win, Barty became the fifth woman (after Serena Williams, Maria Sharapova, Petra Kvitová, and Dominika Cibulková) to win the tournament on debut.

Barty won $4.42 million USD in prize money by claiming the title, the most prize money ever won by a player at a single tennis tournament, male or female. Barty secured the year-end world No. 1 ranking after playing her second round-robin match. Karolína Plíšková and Naomi Osaka were also in contention for the top ranking.

Barty, Bianca Andreescu, Belinda Bencic and Sofia Kenin (as an alternate replacing Andreescu) made their debuts in the event.

The tiebreak between Elina Svitolina and Karolína Plíšková in the round-robin stage, which Svitolina won 14–12, was the longest of the season.

Seeds

Alternates

Draw

Finals

Red group

† Following WTA rules, Bertens' retirement against Bencic was counted as a straight-set loss in determining round robin standings.

Purple group

† Following WTA rules, Andreescu's retirement against Plíšková was counted as a straight-set loss in determining round robin standings.

Standings are determined by: 1. number of wins; 2. number of matches; 3. in two-player ties, head-to-head records; 4. in three-player ties, (a) percentage of sets won (head-to-head records if two players remain tied), then (b) percentage of games won (head-to-head records if two players remain tied), then (c) WTA rankings.

References

External Links
Main Draw

2019 Singles
Finals